Scott Fitzgerald Kennedy (born March 31, 1997) is a Canadian professional soccer player who plays as a centre-back for 2. Bundesliga club SSV Jahn Regensburg and the Canada national team.

Club career

Early career 
Kennedy moved to Germany as an 18-year-old, signing with SBC Traunstein in 2015, and later with FC Amberg in 2016. Kennedy would move to Austria in June 2017, joining Austrian Regionalliga West club SV Grödig. In July 2018, he signed with Austria Klagenfurt.

Jahn Regensburg 
In August 2020, Kennedy joined 2. Bundesliga side Jahn Regensburg on a three-year contract. Kennedy's performances in his first season impressed, particularly in the 2020–21 DFB-Pokal where Regensburg knocked out Bundesliga side 1. FC Köln to advance to the quarter-finals.

International career

While with Regensburg, Kennedy would begin to get interest in representing Canada internationally. On May 26, 2021, Jahn Regensburg confirmed Kennedy had been called up to Canada for their upcoming 2022 FIFA World Cup qualification matches. He made his debut for Canada on June 8 in the match against Suriname, playing the full 90 minutes in a 4–0 victory. On June 18, Kennedy was named to the 60-man preliminary squad for the 2021 CONCACAF Gold Cup. On July 1, he was named to the final squad. On July 10, he was replaced in the squad by Frank Sturing due to medical reasons.

In late October 2022, Kennedy suffered a shoulder injury in a league match that his coach Mersad Selimbegovic confirmed would sideline him for "a few months," ruling him out of consideration for the 2022 FIFA World Cup squad.

Career statistics

Club

International

References

External links
 
 

Living people
1997 births
Soccer players from Calgary
Canadian soccer players
Association football central defenders
Canada men's international soccer players
2. Liga (Austria) players
2. Bundesliga players
FC Amberg players
SV Grödig players
SK Austria Klagenfurt players
SSV Jahn Regensburg players
Canadian expatriate sportspeople in Germany
Expatriate footballers in Germany
Canadian expatriate sportspeople in Austria
Expatriate footballers in Austria